Freud's Leaving Home is a 1991 Swedish comedy film directed by Susanne Bier. The film won ten awards and was nominated for three.

The film follows a girl, Freud, from a Jewish family in Sweden. It was the first feature film in Sweden to depict Swedish-Jewish culture.

Cast
Ghita Nørby as Rosha Cohen
Gunilla Röör as Freud
Palle Granditsky as Ruben Cohen
Philip Zandén as David Cohen
Jessica Zandén as Deborah Cohen
Peter Andersson as Adrian
Stina Ekblad as Nurse
Nils Eklund as Herman
Basia Frydman as Vera
Pierre Fränckel as Max
Peter Stormare as Berra
Johan Rabaeus as Dr. Lundgren
Torgny Anderberg as Chicken Customer
Lottie Ejebrant as Party Woman

Awards

Won
1992 Angers European First Film Festival:
Audience Award - (Susanne Bier)
C.I.C.A.E. Award - (Susanne Bier)
1992 Bodil Awards:
Best Actress - (Ghita Nørby)
1992 Créteil International Women's Film Festival:
Grand Prix Award - (Susanne Bier)
1992 European Film Awards:
Best Supporting Actress - (Ghita Nørby)
1992 Guldbagge Awards:
Best Actress - (Gunilla Röör)
1991 Montréal World Film Festival:
Special Mention - (Susanne Bier)
1992 Robert Festival:
Best Actress - (Ghita Nørby)
Best Screenplay - (Marianne Goldman)
Best Supporting Actress - (Jessica Zandén)

Nominated
1992 Guldbagge Awards:
Best Actress - (Ghita Nørby)
Best Director - (Susanne Bier)
Best Screenplay - (Marianne Goldman)

References

External links

1991 films
1991 comedy films
Swedish comedy films
1990s Swedish-language films
Films about Jews and Judaism
Films directed by Susanne Bier
1991 directorial debut films
1990s Swedish films